Musicians of the Sky (French:Les Musiciens du ciel) is a 1940 French language motion picture drama directed by Georges Lacombe, based on novel "Musiciens Du Ceil" by René Lefèvre who co-wrote screenplay with Jean Ferry. The music score is by Arthur Honegger and Arthur Hoérée. The film stars Michèle Morgan, Michel Simon and René Lefèvre.

The principal actors Michèle Morgan and Michel Simon, had earlier appeared together in Port of Shadows (1938), but then they had not been comrades.

Primary cast
Michèle Morgan as Le lieutenant Saulnier 
Michel Simon as Le capitaine Simon 
René Lefèvre as Victor 
René Alexandre as Louis 
Auguste Bovério as Le commissaire 
Sylvette Saugé as La Louise 
Alexandre Rignault as Le grand Georges

External links
Les Musiciens du ciel at DvdToile

1940 films
Films directed by Georges Lacombe
French drama films
1940 drama films
1940s French-language films
French black-and-white films
Films scored by Arthur Honegger
Films scored by Arthur Hoérée
1940s French films